The Awabakal people , are those Aboriginal Australians who identify with or are descended from the Awabakal tribe and its clans, Indigenous to the coastal area of what is now known as the Hunter Region of New South Wales. Their traditional territory spread from Wollombi in the west, to the Lower Hunter River near Newcastle and Lake Macquarie in the north.

The name Kuringgai, also written Guringai, has often been used as a collective denominator of the Awabakal and several other tribes in this belt, but Norman Tindale has challenged it as an arbitrary coinage devised by ethnologist John Fraser in 1892. For Tindale, Kuringgai was synonymous with Awabakal. Arthur Capell however asserted that there was indeed evidence for a distinct Kuringgai language, which, in Tindale's schema, would imply they were a distinct people from the Awabakal.

Name
In their language, awaba was the word for Lake Macquarie, meaning flat or plain surface, and by extension referred to the people native to that area. The Awabakal were bounded to the north–west by the Wonnarua, the Worimi to the north–east, and the Darkinung peoples to the west and south. Awaba is now the name of a small town in the region.

Language

Awabakal language was recorded by Lancelot Edward Threlkeld and Awabakal Leader Birabahn in 'An Australian grammar : comprehending the principles and natural rules of the language as spoken by the Aborigines in the vicinity of Hunter's River, Lake MacQuarie & New South Wales' -'and this is the first, and most comprehensive record of any indigenous language in Australia.

The City of Newcastle is in the process of educating the wider community about dual name sites and traditional language history of Newcastle Muluubinba.

 Whibayganba – Nobbys Headland
 Tahlbihn – Flagstaff Hill (Fort Scratchley)
 Burrabihngarn – Pirate Point (Stockton)
 Yohaaba – Port Hunter
 Coquun – Hunter River
 Khanterin – Shepherds Hill (The Hill)
 Toohrnbing – Ironbark Creek
 Burraghihnbihng – Hexham Swamp.

Country
More recent estimates are that Awabakal territory covers 2870 square kilometres.

Practices
The eaglehawk or wedge-tailed eagle has special significance for the Awabakal people. Kon, their "celestial entity", looks like an Aboriginal man, but in flight resembles an eagle-hawk.

The Awabakal people played a significant part in shaping the environment of their region. They practised fire-stick farming extensively, which helped them to hunt and to navigate through dense prickly scrub along the coast. Newcastle's main city thoroughfare, Watt Street was built over an Awabakal path from the shore to the top of a hill. Fishing, particularly for shellfish, was a significant part of the Awabakal people's diet and culture pre-colonisation.

The Awabakal, in pre-colonisation times, were noted as being strong and determined defenders of their territory, the means by which the defence occurred need to be explored to deepen understanding of the culture. They had possession of their rich coastal territory for thousands of years, during which time they successfully repelled incursions by the neighbouring Gamilaraay people and established places of defence, "virtual armouries", high in the Watagan Mountains.

Today
Descendants of the traditional owners, that is, descendants of those Awabakal forebears who survived the British invasion/colonisation massacres, especially during the land grab of 1826, are direct descendants of Margaret and Ned or Mahrahkah. 
These descendants are connected through their families/family culture together and represented by the Awabakal Descendants of the Traditional Owners Aboriginal Corporation.

These people, the traditional owners of the Awabakal region have lived on, loved and looked after the magnificent Awabakal land and water systems continuously for millennia, at least since the last Ice Age, 11,800 years ago.

Their extraordinary resilience, is in part due to their excellence in civic relations, as demonstrated by their forebear, the most important Indigenous Intellectual of Australia in C19th, Birabahn and this is seen in their consideration of newly settled Aboriginal people on Awabakal lands and water places.

Recently settled Aboriginal people in this region partake in community support organisations like 'The Awabakal Newcastle Aboriginal Cooperative Limited', which is a not-for-profit community controlled organisation operating in the Newcastle, Lake Macquarie and Hunter Region. It was established in 1976. It is responsible for the delivery of community and health services to Aboriginal people in this region, including:
 the Awabakal Medical Centre;
 the Awabakal Disability Service which provides "short to medium term support to young people living with a disability";
 culturally appropriate care for older people;
 and child care services.

Butterfly Cave
The Butterfly Cave at West Wallsend is part of “women’s business” related to birthing, and has been the subject of decades of active protection by women. However, the site sits on privately owned land allotted for a growing housing estate, owned by Hammersmith Management which is owned by the Roche Group. As of late 2021, women must seek permission to cross the owned land, despite the site being a protected site under the Federal Aboriginal and Torres Strait Islander Heritage Protection (ATSIHP) Act and was recognised as a New South Wales 'Aboriginal Place' in 2013.

Centres
The Awabakal Environmental Education Centre began operating in 1976. It is an NSW Department of Education and Communities facility. The centre provides opportunities for teachers and students in the Hunter Region to learn about the environment and human interactions with the natural world. Wollotuka, meaning an 'eating and meeting place' originally began as a support programme in 1983 to assist and promote university studies for indigenous people. Wollotuka's all indigenous staff moved into their new building, Birabahn in 2002, and the Wollotuka Institute was officially established in 2009.

Native title
In 2013 an association of Awabakal and Guringai descendants laid claim to native title over land from Maitland to Hornsby. The claim was opposed by representatives of the Worimi and Wonnarua as asserting rights over their own traditional territories. In 2017 the claim was withdrawn after the NSW government claimed that, while the claim group, the Descendants of the Traditional Owners Aboriginal Corporation had shown descent from the original people indigenous to the area, it was argued that they had failed to demonstrate continuous preservation of customary laws and practices since the onset of white colonization.

Notable Awabakal people
 Birabana recognised headman of the Awaba clan who assisted the Rev Lancelot Threlkeld compile the first grammar of an Aboriginal language in Australia.

Alternative names
 Awaba (Awabakal toponym designating Lake Macquarie)
 Awabagal
 Kuri (generic term ("man") in Sydney area languages).
 Kuringgai
 "Lake Macquarie, Newcastle" tribe
 Minyowa (Awabakal horde at Newcastle)
 Minyowie

Source:

See also
 Arwarbukarl Cultural Resource Association
 Kuringgai

Notes

Citations

References

External links
 Bibliography of Awabakal language and people resources, at the Australian Institute of Aboriginal and Torres Strait Islander Studies

 
Central Coast (New South Wales)